Louise Hunt is a British coroner who is currently HM Coroner for Birmingham and Solihull, and the first female ever to take up the role, preceded by eight male coroners before her.

Before becoming the coroner, she had left her hometown of Newcastle-under-Lyme for Birmingham at 18 and worked as a nurse at Queen Elizabeth Hospital Birmingham, graduating with a law degree in 1992. She was appointed in 2013 on the resignation of Aidan Cotter OBE who had been in the role for little more than a decade. In the process, Louise became the first female coroner in Birmingham.

In 2016 she was asked by a campaign of bereaved families to resume the inquest into the Birmingham pub bombings of 1974.

References

Living people
English nurses
British coroners
Date of birth missing (living people)
Place of birth missing (living people)
Year of birth missing (living people)
People from Newcastle-under-Lyme